Omaha Civic Auditorium was a multi-purpose convention center located in Omaha, Nebraska. Opened in 1954, it surpassed the Ak-Sar-Ben Coliseum as the largest convention/entertainment complex in the city, until the completion of CHI Health Center Omaha in 2003. With the opening of the Ralston Arena in 2012, all teams that played at the Civic Auditorium moved, which reduced the venue's viability. The auditorium closed its doors in June 2014 and was demolished two years later.

Facilities

Arena 
The Civic Auditorium arena seated up to 9,300 for sporting events and up to 10,960 for concerts.

In the past, the arena was home to the Creighton Bluejays men's basketball team, the Creighton women's basketball and volleyball teams, and the University of Nebraska Omaha hockey team, and the Kansas City-Omaha Kings NBA basketball team.

The arena was the site of the Missouri Valley Conference men's basketball tournament title game in 1978. It was also the site of the seventh WWF In Your House pay-per-view in 1996. Billy Graham's Nebraska Crusade took place at the arena in 1964.

One of Elvis Presley's final concerts 
One of Elvis Presley's final concerts was held at the Civic Auditorium on June 19, 1977. The concert was filmed for a CBS TV special, Elvis in Concert.

"You're no Jack Kennedy" 

A notable event at the Civic Auditorium was the 1988 U.S. vice-presidential debate between Democrat Lloyd Bentsen and Republican Dan Quayle.  The debate produced one of the most famous quotes in American political history.

Quayle, then a U.S. Senator from Indiana, had been a relative political unknown and reporters covering the campaign wondered if he would make a suitable president if something were to have happened to George H. W. Bush, who selected him as his running mate.  In response to a question, Quayle pointed out that he had as much experience in the Senate as John F. Kennedy had prior to being elected President of the United States in 1960.  To which, Bentsen, a Senate veteran from Texas, responded: "Senator, I served with Jack Kennedy, I knew Jack Kennedy, Jack Kennedy was a friend of mine. Senator, you're no Jack Kennedy."

Omaha Civic Auditorium Music Hall 
The Omaha Civic Auditorium Music Hall, located on the east side of Omaha Civic Auditorium, was used for concerts, Broadway shows and other events. It seated 2,453 and was known for its intimate yet casual atmosphere.

Exhibit Hall 
The Civic Auditorium exhibit hall features 43,400 square feet (4,000 m²) of space for conventions and trade shows.

Mancuso Hall 
Mancuso Hall is a large-events venue used for parties, trade shows, concerts, banquets, and conventions, among other events. 25,000 square feet (2300 m²) of space, Mancuso Hall seats 2,500 for concerts and 1,500 for banquets.

Demolition 
Demolition of the Civic Auditorium began in August 2016.
Nothing remains except bare dirt and grass at the site.

See also 
 CHI Health Center Omaha, which replaced the Auditorium as the city's major indoor arena
 Baxter Arena, which opened in 2015 and filled the market niche left behind by the Auditorium 
 Mid-America Center
 Rosenblatt Stadium (defunct)
 Ak-Sar-Ben (arena) (defunct)
 TD Ameritrade Park
 Morrison Stadium
 Ralston Arena

References

Sacramento Kings
1954 establishments in Nebraska
Indoor arenas in Nebraska
Defunct indoor arenas in the United States
Buildings and structures in Omaha, Nebraska
Convention centers in Nebraska
Creighton Bluejays basketball venues
Defunct college basketball venues in the United States
Defunct college ice hockey venues in the United States
Former National Basketball Association venues
Indoor ice hockey venues in the United States
Defunct indoor ice hockey venues in the United States
Indoor soccer venues in the United States
Defunct indoor soccer venues in the United States
Omaha Ak-Sar-Ben Knights
Sports venues in Omaha, Nebraska
Theatres in Omaha, Nebraska
Sports venues completed in 1954
2014 disestablishments in Nebraska
Demolished buildings and structures in Omaha, Nebraska